Ayi Sutarno is a former Indonesian tennis player. Sometimes she has been known as Aji Sutarno or Ayi Soetarno.

At the 1978 Asian Games in Bangkok, Ayi Sutarno won the bronze medal in the Mixed Doubles with partner Hadiman.

External links

Indonesian female tennis players
Living people
Year of birth missing (living people)
Asian Games bronze medalists for Indonesia
Medalists at the 1978 Asian Games
Asian Games medalists in tennis
Southeast Asian Games gold medalists for Indonesia
Southeast Asian Games silver medalists for Indonesia
Southeast Asian Games bronze medalists for Indonesia
Southeast Asian Games medalists in tennis
Tennis players at the 1978 Asian Games
Competitors at the 1977 Southeast Asian Games
20th-century Indonesian women